Pete Sampras was the defending champion.

Ivan Lendl won the title, defeating Sampras, 5–7, 6–4, 6–4, 3–6, 6–3 in the final.

Seeds

Draw

Finals

Top half

Section 1

Section 2

Bottom half

Section 3

Section 4

References

External links
 Main draw

U.S. Pro Indoor
1991 ATP Tour